Alan Patrick may refer to:
 Alan Patrick (footballer) (born 1983), Brazilian footballer
 Alan Patrick (fighter) (born 1991), Brazilian footballer

See also